Gil de Andrade (born 1883) was a Portuguese fencer. He competed in the individual foil event at the 1924 Summer Olympics.

References

External links
 

1883 births
Year of death missing
Portuguese male foil fencers
Olympic fencers of Portugal
Fencers at the 1924 Summer Olympics